Superliga Femenina de Voleibol 2011–12 was the 43rd season since its establishment. The 2011–12 season started in October 2011, and finished in April 2012.

Defending champions, Valeriano Allès Menorca were able to defend its previous season title and won its second title in a row.

2011–12 season teams

2011–12 season standings

Championship playoffs

Bracket
To best of three games.

Semifinals

Match 1

|}

Match 2

|}

Match 3

|}

Match 4

|}

Final

Match 1

|}

Match 2

|}

Match 3

|}

Top scorers
(This statistics includes regular season, copa de la reina and supercopa matches.)

References

External links
Real Federación Española de Voleibol

1ªFemale
2011 in women's volleyball
2011 in Spanish sport
2012 in women's volleyball
2012 in Spanish sport